The Prodigal is a 1955 epic biblical film.

The Prodigal, Prodigal or Prodigals may also refer to:

Arts, entertainment and media

Film and television
 The Prodigal (1931 film), an early talkie film
 The Prodigal (1983 film), directed by James F. Collier
 "The Prodigal" (Angel), a 2000 episode of the TV show 
 "The Prodigal", a 1985 episode of MacGyver TV series)
 "The Prodigal", a 1996 episode of Xena: Warrior Princess (season 1) TV series
 "The Prodigal", a 2008 episode of Stargate Atlantis (season 5) TV series
 "Prodigal", a 2003 episode of Smallville (season 2) TV series

Music
 Prodigal (band), an American progressive contemporary Christian music band
 Prodigal (album), a 1982 album by the band
 "Prodigal", a song by Porcupine Tree from the 2002 album In Absentia
 "Prodigal", a song by OneRepublic from the 2007 album Dreaming Out Loud
 "Prodigal", a song by Relient K from the 2016 album Air for Free
 "The Prodigal", a song by Placebo from the 2022 album Never Let Me Go
 The Prodigal (album), a 2021 album by Nigerian singer Mr. P
 The Prodigals, an American Irish punk band

Theatre
The Prodigal, a 1960 play by Jack Richardson
Prodigal (musical), a 2000 musical by Dean Bryant and Mathew Frank
Prodigals (play), by Sean Minogue, 2011

Other uses in arts and entertainment
 The Prodigal, a 2004 poetry collection by Derek Walcott

Other uses
PRODIGAL (computer system)

See also

The Prodigal Son (disambiguation)
Return of the Prodigal Son (disambiguation)
Prodigy (disambiguation)